Julia Ann Harris (December 2, 1925August 24, 2013) was an American actress. Renowned for her classical and contemporary stage work, she received five Tony Awards for Best Actress in a Play.

Harris debuted on Broadway in 1945, against the wishes of her mother, who wanted her to be a society debutante. Harris was acclaimed for her performance as an isolated 12-year-old girl in the 1950 play The Member of the Wedding, a role she reprised in the 1952 film of the same name, for which she was nominated for the Academy Award for Best Actress. In 1951, her range was demonstrated as Sally Bowles in the original production of I Am a Camera, for which she won her first Tony award. She subsequently appeared in the 1955 film version.

Harris gave acclaimed performances in films including The Haunting (1963), and Reflections in a Golden Eye (1967), in which she played opposite Marlon Brando. In addition to her Tony award for I Am a Camera (1951), she won Tonys for The Lark (1956), Forty Carats (1969), The Last of Mrs. Lincoln (1973), and The Belle of Amherst (1977). She was also a Grammy Award winner and a three time Emmy Award winner.

Harris was inducted into the American Theatre Hall of Fame in 1979, received the National Medal of Arts in 1994, and the 2002 Special Lifetime Achievement Tony Award.

Early life and education
Julia Ann Harris was born in Grosse Pointe, Michigan, the daughter of Elsie L. (née Smith), a nurse, and William Pickett Harris, an investment banker and authority on zoology. She had an older brother, William, and a younger brother, Richard. She graduated from Grosse Pointe Country Day School, which later merged with two others to form the University Liggett School. In New York City, she attended The Hewitt School. As a teenager, she also trained at the Perry-Mansfield Performing Arts School & Camp in Colorado with Charlotte Perry, a mentor who encouraged Harris to apply to the Yale School of Drama, which she soon attended for a year. In 2007, Yale bestowed an honorary Doctor of Fine Arts degree upon Harris. As a founding member of Lee Strasberg's Actors Studio, Harris studied method acting, which emphasized psychology and emotions, and was able to successfully employ its techniques, although it was strongly associated with male actors.

Career

Stage roles
In 1952, Harris won her first Best Actress Tony Award for originating the role of insouciant Sally Bowles in I Am a Camera, the stage version of Christopher Isherwood's Goodbye to Berlin (later adapted as the Broadway musical Cabaret (1966) and as the 1972 film, with Liza Minnelli as Sally). Harris repeated her stage role in the film version of I Am a Camera (1955).

Of particular note is her Tony-winning performance in The Belle of Amherst, a one-woman play (written by William Luce and directed by Charles Nelson Reilly) based on the life and poetry of Emily Dickinson. She received a Grammy Award for Best Spoken Word Recording for the audio recording of the play. She first performed the play in 1976 and subsequently appeared in other solo shows, including Luce's Brontë. Other Broadway credits include The Playboy of the Western World, Macbeth, The Member of the Wedding, A Shot in the Dark, Skyscraper, And Miss Reardon Drinks a Little, Forty Carats, The Glass Menagerie, A Doll's House, The Gin Game, and a North American tour in 1992 of Lettice and Lovage in the lead part originated by Maggie Smith on Broadway.

In 1983, Harris became a company member of The Mirror Theater Ltd's Mirror Repertory Company. She became a mentor to the company, having urged Founding Artistic Director Sabra Jones to create the company from 1976 forward, when Jones married John Strasberg. Harris and Jones met at a performance of The Belle of Amherst, a revival of which The Mirror Theater Ltd recently performed in their summer home in Vermont.

Harris ties with Angela Lansbury with five Tony Award wins (Audra McDonald has since passed them both, with six wins). However, she holds the record (alongside Chita Rivera) for the most individual Tony Award nominations, with 10. In 1966, Harris won the Sarah Siddons Award for her work in Chicago theatre.

Film roles
Harris's screen debut was in 1952, repeating her Broadway success as the lonely teenaged girl Frankie in Carson McCullers's The Member of the Wedding, for which she was nominated for the Academy Award for Best Actress.

Director Elia Kazan cast her in East of Eden (1955) opposite James Dean in his first major screen role. She played the ethereal Eleanor Lance in The Haunting (1963), director Robert Wise's screen adaptation of a novel by Shirley Jackson. Another cast member recalled Harris refusing to socialize with the other actors while not on set, later explaining that she had done so as a method of emphasizing the alienation from the other characters experienced by her character in the film. 

Other notable films Harris appeared in during the 1960s include Requiem for a Heavyweight (1962), Harper (with Paul Newman) (1966), and Reflections in a Golden Eye (1967).  Another noteworthy film appearance was the World War II drama The Hiding Place (1975).

Television roles
Harris was nominated for 11 Primetime Emmy Awards for her television work, winning three. She starred as Nora Helmer opposite Christopher Plummer in A Doll's House (1959), a 90-minute television adaptation of Henrik Ibsen's play. She made more appearances in leading roles on the Hallmark program than any other actress, also appearing in two different adaptations of the play Little Moon of Alban, her performance in the 1958 TV movie of the same name earning her the Primetime Emmy Award for Outstanding Lead Actress in a Limited Series or Movie.

Her second Emmy win came for her role as Queen Victoria in the 1961 Hallmark Hall of Fame production of Laurence Housman's Victoria Regina. She received further Emmy nominations for a range of roles including Anastasia (1967), The Last of Mrs. Lincoln (1976)—where she reprised her Tony-winning role as Mary Todd Lincoln from the 1973 play of the same name—and The Woman He Loved (1988). She won her third Emmy award in 2000 for Outstanding Voice-Over Performance for her voice role of Susan B. Anthony in Not for Ourselves Alone.

In 1980, Harris guest starred in the series Knots Landing as country singer Lilimae Clements, the eccentric and protective mother of Valene Ewing (Joan Van Ark); she returned to the series as a regular character from 1981 to 1987. The role earned Harris a nomination for the Primetime Emmy Award for Outstanding Supporting Actress in a Drama Series, and two Soap Opera Digest Award nominations.

Audio and voiceover work
Harris made two recordings of narrations of E. B. White's children's book Stuart Little for the Pathways of Sound record label: the last six chapters for a single LP record in 1965, and the entire book for a two-record set in 1979. She also recorded narrations of many children's books for Caedmon Records.

Harris also did extensive voiceover work for documentary maker Ken Burns: the voices of Emily Warren Roebling in Brooklyn Bridge (1981), Ann Lee in The Shakers: Hands to Work, Hearts to God (1984), and most notably Southern diarist Mary Boykin Chesnut for Burns' 1990 series The Civil War.

Later years
In the summer of 2008, she appeared on stage again in Chatham, Massachusetts, as "Nanny" in a Monomoy Theater production of The Effect of Gamma Rays on Man-in-the-Moon Marigolds.

Harris continued to work until 2009, well into her eighties, narrating five historical documentaries by Christopher Seufert and Mooncusser Films, as well as being active as a director on the board of the independent Wellfleet Harbor Actors Theater (WHAT). In 2007, when the company built a new, additional theater, also in Wellfleet, Massachusetts, Ms Harris declined to have the building named for her. However, she consented to their naming "a piece of it after me"; WHAT named their stage the "Julie Harris Stage".

Personal life
Harris lived in West Chatham, Cape Cod, for many years until her death. Three times divorced, she had one son, Peter Gurian. A breast cancer survivor, she suffered a severe fall requiring surgery in 1999, a stroke in 2001, and a second stroke in 2010.

Harris died on August 24, 2013, of congestive heart failure at her home in West Chatham, Massachusetts. Harris was cremated after her death.

Legacy
On December 5, 2005, Harris was named a Kennedy Center Honoree. At a White House ceremony, President George W. Bush remarked: "It's hard to imagine the American stage without the face, the voice, and the limitless talent of Julie Harris. She has found happiness in her life's work, and we thank her for sharing that happiness with the whole world."

Ben Brantley, theater critic for The New York Times, considered her "the actress who towered most luminously ... rather like a Statue of Liberty for Broadway." Alec Baldwin, who played Harris's son on Knots Landing, praised her in a tribute in the Huffington Post: "Her voice was like rainfall. Her eyes connected directly to and channeled the depths of her powerful and tender heart. Her talent, a gift from God."

On August 28, 2013, Broadway theaters dimmed their lights for one minute in honor of Harris.

On December 3, 2013, Joan Van Ark announced at a Broadway memorial service the creation of the Julie Harris Scholarship, which provides annual support to an actor studying at the Yale School of Drama. Alec Baldwin made the first contribution. In 2021, Yale Drama became tuition-free and was rebranded the David Geffen School of Drama at Yale University.

Credits

Stage

Films

Television

References

Further reading
 Young, Jordan R. (1989). Acting Solo: The Art of One-Person Shows. Beverly Hills: Past Times Publishing Co. Introduction by Julie Harris. . .

External links

 
 
 
 TonyAwards.com Interview with Julie Harris
 Senior Women Web Interviews: Julie Harris – Too Good to be True? 

1925 births
2013 deaths
20th-century American actresses
21st-century American actresses
Actresses from Massachusetts
Actresses from Michigan
Actresses from New York City
American film actresses
American musical theatre actresses
American television actresses
Caedmon Records artists
Donaldson Award winners
Grammy Award winners
Method actors
Hewitt School alumni
Kennedy Center honorees
People from Chatham, Massachusetts
People from Grosse Pointe, Michigan
People from Manhattan
Outstanding Performance by a Lead Actress in a Miniseries or Movie Primetime Emmy Award winners
Special Tony Award recipients
Tony Award winners
United States National Medal of Arts recipients
Yale University alumni
Yale School of Drama alumni
Deaths from congestive heart failure